The Killer Department: Detective Viktor Burakov's Eight-Year Hunt for the Most Savage Serial Killer in Russian History is a non-fiction book detailing the manhunt, capture and subsequent conviction of Russian serial killer Andrei Chikatilo. Written by Robert Cullen (at the time a foreign reporter covering issues relating to the Soviet Union and Russia for The New Yorker magazine), the book was released in 1993.

The Killer Department was made into a feature film titled Citizen X in 1995.

Overview
The hardcover overview from amazon.com says: "obsessed with finding the killer, faced formidable odds-among them the maze of the Soviet system".

References

External links 
 Contemporary news article detailing the release of The Killer Department 
 The Killer Department at goodreads.com

1993 non-fiction books
Non-fiction books adapted into films
Non-fiction books about serial killers